Eric J. Tarr (born September 10, 1972) is a Republican member of the West Virginia Senate, representing the 4th district since January 9, 2019. Tarr beat appointed Senator Mark Drennan in the 2018 GOP primaries, becoming one of three challengers to beat GOP incumbents.

Legislature 
Tarr has previously served as co-chairman of the Senate's Joint Legislative Oversight Committee on Health and Human Resources, co-chairman of Joint Health Committee, co-chairman of the Joint Committee on Technology, and vice chairman of the Senate Health committee. He currently serves as the Chairman of the Senate Committee on Finance.

In June 2021, Tarr spoke out against critical race theory in West Virginia, despite the lack of evidence that it is currently taught in state public schools.

Personal 
Tarr is CEO of Generations Physical Therapy Centers in the Charleston and Huntington area. Tarr is the former President of the West Virginia Physical Therapy Association.

Election results

References

1972 births
Living people
People from Putnam County, West Virginia
Republican Party West Virginia state senators
Businesspeople from West Virginia
21st-century American politicians